Monde Nissin Corporation is a Philippine food and beverage company with a portfolio of brands across instant noodles, biscuits, baked goods, culinary aids and alternative meat products categories, including Lucky Me!, SkyFlakes, Fita, M.Y. San Grahams and Nissin. Monde Nissin also sells its alternative meat products globally under Quorn Foods and the Quorn brand.

Since 2000, Monde Nissin has been consistently included in the top 50 corporations in the Philippines based on gross revenues.

On March 4, 2021, Monde Nissin filed for registration application with the Philippine Securities and Exchange Commission for an initial public offering of its common shares.

History
The company was founded by Hidayat Darmono, patriarch of the Kweefanus family, as Monde Denmark Nissin Biscuit Corporation and launched its first products Nissin Butter Coconut Biscuits and Nissin Wafers on May 23, 1979. The company launched Lucky Me! in November 1989. In 2015, Monde Nissin acquired Quorn for £550 million, in what was the third largest overseas purchase by a firm in the Southeast Asian nation at the time of the transaction. In 2019, Monde Nissin also invested in NAMZ Pte. Ltd., a food science company in Singapore that redesigns food, beverage, and personal care products.

By 2020, according to Nielsen, Monde Nissin ranked first in retail sales value in the Philippines in instant noodles and biscuits, as well as oyster sauce and yogurt drinks. In 2020, Monde Nissin's instant noodles, biscuits, yogurt drinks and oyster sauce constituted 68%, 30.5%, 73.2% and 56% of retail sales market share in the Philippines, respectively.

Flagship brands contributing to this market leading position included Lucky Me! for instant noodles, SkyFlakes, Fita, Nissin and M.Y. San Grahams for biscuits, Mama Sita's for culinary aids and Dutch Mill for yogurt drinks. By 2020, Quorn Foods also became the market leader in the meat alternatives market in the U.K. with Quorn being the number 1 brand with 28% grocery retail market share by value in 2020, as set out in the OC&C report.

Leadership in the instant noodles segment
In 1989, Monde Nissin ventured into the instant noodles segment with launch of Lucky Me!. It also launched Lucky Me! Instant Mami, noodles with soup in pouches, in Beef and Chicken variants.

The launch of Lucky Me! Pancit Canton, in 1991 the first dry stir-fry pouched noodles in the Philippine market also created a brand new category worth over ₽10 billion in 2020. In 1995, Lucky Me! Supreme in La Paz Batchoy flavor was launched as the first Filipino dish-flavored no-cook cup noodles.

In 2009, Lucky Me! Special was introduced, which consists of noodles with local and international flavors such as Lomi (egg noodles in seafood flavor), Jjamppong (spicy Korean noodles), Curly Spaghetti, Baked Mac, and Mac & Cheez.

In 2014, Kantar Worldpanel, in its Brand Footprint Report, cited Lucky Me! as the most chosen and purchased consumer brand in the Philippines, reaching almost all Filipino households.

Growth of the biscuit segment
In 2001, the company acquired M.Y. San Biscuit, Inc., manufacturer of SkyFlakes, Fita, and M.Y. San Grahams. After the acquisition by Monde Nissin, M.Y. San Biscuit, Inc. changed its name to Monde M.Y. San Corporation.

Several cookies and snack products were also launched, namely Eggnog Cookies, Bread Stix, and Bingo Cookie Sandwich.

In 2005, Voice Combo Sandwich was launched as the first cracker and wafer combo biscuit in the Philippines.

In 2014, Voice Pops was launched as the first cream sandwich with popping candies.

Expansion of product portfolio
In 2006, Monde Nissin entered into distribution agreements with Dutch Mill Co. Ltd. and Dairy Plus Thailand, respectively, under which Monde Nissin became the exclusive distributor of Dutch Mill cultured milk and yogurt products, respectively, in the Philippines. In 2010, Monde Nissin expanded its partnership with Dutch Mill Co. Ltd. to include marketing by Monde Nissin of Dutch Mill products. In 2016, Monde Nissin formed a partnership with Dutch Mill Co., Ltd. for the distribution of Dutch Mill cultured milk.

Additionally in 2010, Monde Nissin entered the culinary solutions market with the introduction of Lucky Me! NamNam All-3-in-1 Seasoning. Its portfolio of culinary aids expanded further with the launch of Lucky Me! NamNam Tomato seasoning in 2013, the first seasoning in the local market with the taste of real tomatoes.

In August 2011, Monde was launched as the first premium-quality packaged baked products line. It initially offered Monde Special Mamon, the first premium-quality baked sponge cake in the Philippines. This was followed by the introduction of Monde Special Cream Puff, Belgian Waffle, and Crispy Waffle.

In 2014, Monde Nissin also became exclusive marketing and distribution arm of Sandpiper Spices and Condiments Corp. for Mama Sita's products, such as sauces, mixes, condiments, meal kits, and coolers.

Monde Nissin continued to expand by entering into a joint venture deal in 2016 with Nippon Indosari, Indonesia's largest bread products producer, to create Sarimonde Foods Corporation, which started its operations in the Philippines in 2017.

Monde Nissin also formed a joint venture called Monde Malee Beverages Corporation in 2017 with Malee Beverage Public Co. Ltd., a leading juice and canned fruit manufacturer in Thailand, and became the exclusive distributor of Malee branded beverage products in the Philippines.

Subsidiaries and partnerships
Apart from developing homegrown brands, Monde Nissin led acquisitions and forged business partnerships, leading to the diversification of its product lines and extended reach in the international market.

Philippines
In 2001, M.Y. San Biscuit, Inc. was acquired by Monde Nissin and renamed Monde M.Y. San Corporation.

In 2014, the company became the exclusive marketing and distribution arm of Marigold Manufacturing Corporation for Mama Sita's products.

In January 2023, the company acquired a 15% stake in The Figaro Coffee Group, parent company of Figaro Coffee, Angel's Pizza and Tien Ma Taiwanese restaurant. The investment marks the company's entry into the foodservice sector.

Thailand
In 2004, Monde Nissin began its expansion in the international manufacturing market through the establishment of another subsidiary, Monde Nissin Thailand.

In 2006, Monde Nissin partnered with Dairy Plus Thailand to distribute Dutch Mill Yoghurt Drink to the Philippines. Four years later, the company took over the local marketing of the brand.

 Australia
In 2015, it acquired Menora Foods, a family-owned Australian food company, its third acquisition in Australia, having previously acquired the Black Swan and Nudie Juice brands.

United Kingdom
In 2015, it bought Quorn for £550m. Quorn Foods is the market leader in the meat alternatives market in the United Kingdom.

Indonesia
Monde Nissin formed a joint venture with Nippon Indosari, Indonesia's largest bread products maker, in 2016 to form Sarimonde Foods Corporation. According to the company, Sarimonde recently acquired Walter Bread, a Filipino brand known for its nutritious and creative bread products, as its first big step in the packaged bread industry. Its portfolio includes Walter Sugar-Free Bread and Walter Double Fiber Wheat Bread, both of which are industry firsts.

Japan
The company also announced a collaboration with Japanese retailer Uniqlo to launch men's and women's shirts featuring Monde Nissin brands such as Lucky Me!, the Philippines' leading instant noodles brand, and Bingo Cookie Sandwich, a popular snack among teenagers.

Brands

Noodles:
 Lucky Me!
 Go Cup (formerly Supreme) (cup noodles)
 Instant Mami (noodles with soup in pouch)
 Pancit Canton (dry noodles in pouch)
 Special (special noodles in pouch)
 NamNam All-3-in-1 Seasoning

Biscuits, Wafers, and Cookies:
 Nissin
 Butter Coconut
 Wafer
 Stick Wafer
 Cubee Wafer
 Bread Stix
 Eggnog
 Waffle Deluxe
 Bingo
 Sumo
 Malkist Sandwich
 M. Y. San
 SkyFlakes
 Fita
 M. Y. San Grahams
 Butter Cookies
 Happy Time

Breads and Cakes:
 Monde
 Special Mamon
 Special Cream Puff
 Cheese Bar
 Fluffy Bread
 Milk Bread 
 Wheat Bread
 Sari Roti
 Walter Bread
 Sugar Free Wheat Bread
 Sugar Free Wheat Pan de Sal
 Double Fiber Wheat Bread
 High Fiber Weight Control Bread
 Whole Wheat Raisin Bread
 Thick Slice Super Loaf

Others:
 Black Swan
 Nudie Yoghurt
 Quorn
 Smoothie Bebe

Distribution:
 Mama Sita's (domestic distribution)
 Peckish Rice Crisps
 Dutch Mill Yogurt Drink
 Dutch Mill Delight
 Dutch Mill Soy Secretz
 Dutch Mill ProYo
 Kratos Iced Coffee
 Nudie Juice
 Jelly Vit Jelly Drink

Former brands:
 Nissin Classic
 Monde Tini Wini
 Hearty Flakes
 Hearty Rich-Flakes
 M. Y. San Animal Biscuits
 M. Y. San Wafers
 Solo
 Lucky Me! Supreme Mami
 Lucky Me! Supreme Pancit Canton
 Snitch Chocolate Bar in Choco Blast
 Snitch Chocolate Bar in Cookies N Cream
 Snitch Chocolate Bar in Strawberry
 Voice 
 Nissin Marie
 One One Rice Snack (divested)

Advocacy
In 2007, Monde Nissin, under Lucky Me!, launched Kainang Pamilya Mahalaga (Family Mealtime Matters) advocacy. It focuses on the promotion of frequent family meals together as a way to strengthen the foundations of the Filipino family. The advocacy was supported by Presidential Proclamation 326 dated January 2012, which declared every 4th Monday of September to be Kainang Pamilya Mahalaga day.

Controversy
Health authorities in Malta, Ireland, France, and other countries have issued warnings for the consumptions of the export variants of different Lucky Me noodles due to containing high amounts of Ethylene Oxide.The   Food and Drug Administration in the Philippines have now investigated on this matter. Monde Nissin also lost $350 million in market value due to the warnings with the stock sinking more than 10%. Then, it was later confirmed that the contaminated batches of Lucky Me products are only affecting export versions (which are made in Thailand) and not the local versions (which are made in the Philippines). The local batches of Lucky Me meet the EU acceptable level of 0.02 mg/kg or below.

See also 
List of instant noodle brands

References

External links
 

Companies based in Santa Rosa, Laguna
Companies based in Makati
Food and drink companies established in 1979
Food and drink companies of the Philippines
Snack food manufacturers of the Philippines
Confectionery companies of the Philippines
Philippine companies established in 1979
Companies listed on the Philippine Stock Exchange